Collective Bargaining is the third studio album by underground rapper and Army of the Pharaohs member King Syze. It was entirely produced by Skammadix. An Extended Play version was released on to iTunes on 13 August 2013.

Background

Definition 
Collective bargaining is a process of negotiations between employers and a group of employees aimed at reaching agreements that regulate working conditions. The interests of the employees are commonly presented by representatives of a trade union to which the employees belong.

Album background 
On 4 October 2011, King Syze released his third studio album Collective Bargaining. It featured Celph Titled, Esoteric, Planetary, Baby Blak, Burke The Jurke, Doap Nixon, Kev Turner Side Effect, Blacastan, V-Zilla, OuterSpace, Diabolic, Jus Allah, King Magnetic, Reef the Lost Cauze, Apathy, Chris Webby, Lawrence Arnell, Rockie Eyes, Poynt Blanc, M-Dot, Crypt the Warchild, Ill Bill, and Vinnie Paz and contained production work from Skammadix and scratches from DJ Kwestion. Collective Bargaining was not released on a label. An Extended Play version was released on to iTunes on 13 August 2013.

Track listing

References

External links

2011 albums
King Syze albums